Minor hockey is an umbrella term for amateur ice hockey which is played below the junior age level. Players are classified by age, with each age group playing in its own league. The rules, especially as it relates to body contact, vary from class to class. In North America, the rules are governed by the national bodies, Hockey Canada and USA Hockey, while local hockey associations administer players and leagues for their region. Many provinces and states organize regional and provincial championship tournaments, and the highest age groups in Canada and USA also participate in national championships.

Minor hockey is not to be confused with minor league professional hockey.

Canada 

In Canada, the age categories are designated by each provincial hockey governing body based on Hockey Canada's guidelines, and each category may have multiple tiers based on skill.

In November 2019, Hockey Canada announced that beginning in 2020 (officially taking effect in the 2020–21 season), it would refer to its age categories by their age limits (with "midget" being renamed "U18", for example) rather than by names. It stated that the new names would be more concise, while there had also been concerns over use of the term "midget" in this context—as the word is now considered a pejorative towards dwarfism.

Age categories
To qualify in a category, the player must be under the age limit as of December 31 of the current season.

 U7 (formerly Initiation, Mini Mite, Tyke or H1/H2, Pre-MAHG (Méthode d’Apprentissage de Hockey sur Glace), MAHG 1 and 2): under 7 years of age In some larger areas with multiple associations in close proximity, Tyke is broken up by age into U6 (minor U7 or H1) for 5-year-old players and U7 (major U7, major tyke, orH2) for 6 years old players. In the Province of Quebec, players start in Pre-MAHG to initiate skating techniques. Over the next two following years they are in levels MAHG 1 and MAHG 2 to develop a sense of the game. 
 U9 (formerly Novice or Mite or H3/H4 or MAHG3/MAHG4): under 9 years of age In some larger areas, U9 is broken up by age into U8 (minor U9 or minor novice or H3) for 7-year-old players and U9 (major U9 or H4 or major novice) for 8-year-old players.
 U11 (formerly Atom): under 11 years of age
 U13 (formerly Peewee): under 13 years of age
 U15 (formerly Bantam): under 15 years of age
 U18 (formerly Midget): under 18 years of age  Many provinces have U16 or minor Midget leagues that are for 15-year-old players and major midget for 16 to 17-year-old players.
 U20 (formerly Juvenile): under 20 years of age, for players who want to remain in hockey at a minor hockey association level.
 Junior: under 21 years of age Junior: divided into Major Junior (WHL, OHL and QMJHL), Junior A (Tier II Junior), Junior B and Junior C (in some locations).
 Senior: No age limit

Skill categories

There are two broad grouping of skill levels: competitive and non-competitive. From house league/recreation hockey, progression is made to competitive travel hockey. A competitive team will hold tryouts and players will be selected for the roster depending upon skill level and fit.  At this level, players chosen to compete experience a higher level of on-ice competition and coaching. Players learn systems; coaches maximize his/her potential and train them to work together as a unit.

Non-competitive
HL ("House League" or Recreational) teams are intra-city and players may be of any skill level.
Rostered Select teams will consist of better House League players who in addition to HL play, will play in additional games and practices which are organized on an ad hoc basis. Also known as a taxi squad.
League Select teams will consist of better House League Players but can also play in a league for a full season in addition to the House League Season.  This is also known as Select in some area.

Competitive
Higher-skilled players will typically play on "representative" or "travel" teams that will travel to play representative (rep) teams from other areas. These teams are classified by skill. Not all cities will have teams at all skill levels, depending on size and the popularity of hockey, however even small communities may field teams at multiple levels. (For example: Orillia, Ontario, with a population of 30,000, has four distinct skill divisions for 7-year-olds.) The classifications are typically not certified by any external organization, so there is speculation about what levels are truly better or stronger than others. AAA, AA, and A hockey are nationally recognized as competitive levels of organized hockey, with AAA being elite competition. 
  
'House Level' Inter Association hockey never leaving own association
'C'  Playing other associations in a region.
'B' 
'A'
'AA'  
'AAA' is the highest caliber of minor hockey

British Columbia
In British Columbia, BC Hockey has a different system as the province has no "B" level hockey (Rostered select / League select).  All teams are either non-competitive "C" house or competitive Rep teams "A" (Pee Wee to Juvenile).  Rep teams "A' compete exclusively association vs. association under the guidance of PCAHA (Pacific Coast), OMAHA (Okanagan), VIAHA (Island), and are labeled as A1, A2, A3, and A4. No Atom level Provincial championship exists as Atom is considered developmental. The OMAHA and VIAHA have "Atom Development" rep teams, while the PCAHA follows "A1,A2,A3, etc" similar to older ages.  Midget Rep has a BC run Midget AAA league which is the highest level of midget rep, in addition to association run rep teams (A1,A2,A3,etc.)

"A" level teams are designated by the following tiers: Tier 1, Tier 2, Tier 3 and Tier 4. For the purposes of affiliation regulations, each Tier designation will be considered a category.

BC Hockey Registrations of male Midget, Bantam and Pee Wee players from the previous three years with the Associations tiers are determined the according to the following schedule:

The above chart shall be utilized to determine the tier of the "initial entry" team at each division (i.e. the association's top Midget, Bantam and Peewee team).
1.03
a) Associations may register additional teams in any Division in accordance with the following chart:

b)
Any association registering more than two hundred and fifty (250) players in any Age division of Peewee, Bantam, Midget and Juvenile shall be required to register teams in that division in accordance with the following chart:

First Entry, Second Entry Team  Must register two Tier 1 teams
Third Entry Team   Tier 2
Fourth Entry Team  Tier 3
Fifth Entry Team   Tier 4

1.04
All Winter Clubs are designated Tier 1. This designation
is to be reviewed annually by the BC Hockey Executive
Committee following consultation with the District Association.

Quebec
Quebec house leagues are labeled C, B, A. Competitive teams are urbanly known as the "double letters" and are labeled as BB, AA (Atom through Midget Levels), and AAA (urbanly considered as triple-A and higher than the double letters). AAA teams in Quebec only occur from categories Pee-Wee through Junior. The Midget category offers the 'Espoir' Level (primarily 15-year-olds) and falls between AA and AAA distinction. The following are the Levels currently played in the Province of Quebec, as sanctioned by Hockey Quebec:

 Pre-MAHG or Mini-MAHG (4 Years of age)
 Pre-Novice 1 (5 Years of age): MAHG 1
 Pre-Novice 2 (6 Years of age): MAHG 2
 Novice (Ages 7 – 8): N4 -N3 - N2 - N1
 Atom (Ages 9 – 10): C – B – A – BB – AA
 Pee-Wee (Ages 11 – 12): C – B – A – BB – AA – AAA 
 Bantam (Ages 13 – 14): B – A – BB – AA – AAA
 Midget (Ages 15 – 17): B – A – BB – AA – AAA 
 Junior (Ages 18 – 21): B – A – BB – AA

Controversy regarding age distribution in Canadian minor hockey 

In a 2001 study published by the University of Toronto Press, the effects of minor hockey players who are born in the first half of the year (January–June) were directly compared to those who are born in the second half of the calendar year (July–December). The study aimed to determine how age affects a young player's probability of playing at a higher level in the future. Given the relatively short age brackets in Canadian minor hockey (players move up one league every two years before the age of 15), it was hypothesized that players who are born in the latter part of a calendar year are at a disadvantage (theoretically, a child could be playing with peers who are 2.5 years older than themselves under the current Canadian Minor Hockey system). The findings in this research were consistent with the hypothesis; upon extensive testing throughout several leagues and age divisions in Canada, Hurley, Lior and Tracze concluded that age plays a significant factor in a players ability to excel in hockey beyond the house league level.

The findings of this study resulted in the proposal for redistribution of player slotting in minor hockey under a new "quarter" system. The system proposed would split a year into four-quarters, consisting of three months each, for example,1992(3) for players born in 1992 sometime in the third quarter (i.e., sometime in the months July, August or September). Under this proposed system players would play against players of a similar age, never playing opponents who are over 24 months older than them as the current system allows. The proposed system would operate under an 8-year basis, moving players from division to division each year.

Finland 
In Finland, the Finnish Ice Hockey Association roughly categorizes minor hockey players to under school-ages and school-ages. Children over 16 are considered as juniors, although the youngest juniors are still at the school-age.

Starting of season 2020-21 names of the minor and junior levels has been changed to represent the standards used in international competitions and other minor hockey leagues. New minor and junior hockey levels, reference to old level in parentheses:.
 U9 (F2)
 U10 (F1)
 U11 (E2)
 U12 (E1)
 U13 (D2)
 U14 (D1)
 U15 (C2)
 U16 (C1)
 U17 (B2)
 U18 (B)
 U19 (New category)
 U20 (A, Youth)
 U22 (New category)

France 
In France, hockey teams use the following levels:

 Moustiques (age 9 and younger)
 Poussins (ages 10–11)
 Benjamins (ages 12–13)
 Minimes (ages 14–15)
 Cadets (ages 16–17)
 Espoirs (ages 18–20)

Germany 
In Germany, German Ice Hockey Federation designates the following levels:

 Kleinstschüler (Bambini) (ages 9 and younger)
 Kleinschüler (ages 11 and younger)
 Knaben (ages 13 and younger)
 Schüler (ages 15 and younger)
 Jugend (ages 17 and younger)
 Junioren (ages 19 and younger)

All levels are administrated by the respective sub-federation in each province except for the federal leagues which are administrated directly by the German Ice Hockey Federation. Ages were raised in 2010/2011.

Sweden 
The Swedish Ice Hockey Federation designates the following levels:

 U9 (ages 9 and younger)
 U10 (ages 10 and younger)
 U11 (ages 11 and younger)
 U12 (ages 12 and younger)
 U13 (ages 13 and younger)
 U14 (ages 14 and younger)
 U15 (ages 15 and younger)
 U16 (ages 16 and younger)
 J18 (Juniors 18 and younger)
 J20 (Juniors 20 and younger)

Some levels (especially J18 and J20) are directly administrated by the Swedish Ice Hockey Federation, while lower divisions of the Juniors and below are administrated by the respective sub-federation in each landskap.

Switzerland 
The Swiss Ice Hockey Federation designates the following levels : using terms from the national languages of Switzerland. This has nevertheless evolve recently to U9, U11 so this has to be updated.

 Bambini (ages 6–9), Italian for "children". 2 categories : Bambi and Bini
 Piccolo (ages 11 and under), Italian for "little"
 Moskitos (ages 10–12), German for "mosquito". 3 categories : Moskitos B, A and Top
 Mini (ages 12–14), Latin for "small". 3 categories : Minis B, A and Top
 Novizen, Novices or Novizi (ages 15–17), meaning "Novices". 3 categories : Novices A, Top and Elite
 Junioren, Juniors or Juniores (ages 17–20), meaning "Juniors". 4 categories : Juniors A, Top, Elite B and Elite A

United States 
In the United States, USA Hockey designates the following levels:

Girls hockey operates under their own age classifications, namely 10U, 12U, 14U, 16U and 19U.

Many organizations and leagues that have larger numbers of registered players tend to delineate within the two-year window allowed for each age group. In these situations, teams composed entirely or primarily of players in their second year of eligibility are designated 'major' teams, while those with players in their 1st year of eligibility are designated "minor" teams. (For example, ten-year-olds would be "squirt majors" while nine-year-olds would be "squirt minors".) This is especially true in "AAA".

Some leagues separate players six years old and younger into their own group, often referred to using names like "Mini-Mites", "Mosquitoes", or "Microns."

USA Hockey designates four skill levels:
 Tier 1: The highest level of competition, also called "AAA", following the Canadian system.
 Tier 2: also called "AA" or "A".
 Tier 3: may also be called "A", the lowest level of competitive hockey.
 Recreational/Developmental: Includes house league and select. May also be called "B", "C", etc.

AAU 
The Amateur Athletic Union has returned to licensing the sport of ice hockey.

AAU began licensing scholastic ice hockey programs at the HS Varsity and JV classifications about 2009. Then during the 2011–2012 season the AAU began licensing junior and youth leagues as well. The Western States Hockey League (WSHL) moved their operations from USA Hockey into AAU and Hockey Michigan was formed, providing traditional full-ice playing opportunities at the 7U and 8U age classifications (aka mites) in the face of cross-ice mandates adopted by the USA Hockey district affiliate. During the 2012–2013 season, AAU junior and youth operations expanded rapidly and currently span coast to coast. More recently, AAU hockey has expanded their youth and Junior programs into Canada.

Today, AAU is licensing playing opportunities at all youth age classifications, as well as scholastic, junior, collegiate and adult levels.

Although some AAU clubs still use classification terms such as "mites" or "midgets", the official AAU youth designations indicate the age group with the format "xU", where "x" is the maximum age number and the "U" indicates "and under".

Officials 

Officials for youth hockey are often youth players themselves, calling games in lower levels than the one they participate in themselves. As with players who start out playing youth hockey, officials start their officiating career by officiating youth hockey, making it up through the ranks as their officiating skill increases. USA Hockey defines certain levels of their officials and so does Hockey Canada and the International Ice Hockey Federation.

Currently, many youth officials quit after a few games, mainly due to verbal abuse from parents, coaches and players. The other issue faced by young referees is a reluctance from older officials to give them more advanced games. In the US and Canada, news stories pop up from now and then that describes physical abuse on youth officials, in addition to verbal abuse. These problems were addressed in Hockey Canada's "Relax, it's just a game" campaign, which started in 2002.

A youth official can usually move up the ladder to juniors after about 2 years of officiating, and after a few years move up to senior hockey. This is, as with players, different for each individual as their skill-curves are differently shaped.

Many current and former officials feel that their officiating career has aided them in their professional life as well as being more comfortable with handling critical decisions and upset individuals.

See also
Junior ice hockey
Youth ice hockey coach

References

External links 

 Hockey Canada – Minor Hockey
 USA Hockey
 How To Turn Your Child Into A Hockey Player
 Youth Hockey Drills and Skills
 English Ice Hockey
 BCHockey.net
 MyHockeyRankings.com
 CSDHL.org
 Norges Ishockeyforbund (Norwegian Ice Hockey Association)
 Den Norske Skøyte og Hockeyskole – Norwegian skating and hockey school
 A Proposal to Reduce the Age Discrimination in Canadian Minor Hockey

+